Jitender Kumar may refer to:

Jitender Kumar (middleweight boxer) (born 1977), Indian middleweight boxer
Jitender Kumar (flyweight boxer) (born 1988), Indian flyweight boxer